Val-de-Vie is a commune in the department of Calvados, northwestern France. The municipality was established on 1 January 2016 by merger of the former communes of Sainte-Foy-de-Montgommery, La Brévière, La Chapelle-Haute-Grue and Saint-Germain-de-Montgommery.

Notable people
Roger de Montgomery, seigneur of Montgomery

See also 
Communes of the Calvados department

References 

Communes of Calvados (department)
Populated places established in 2016
2016 establishments in France